Nathan Michael Peterman (born May 4, 1994) is an American football quarterback who is a free agent. He played college football at Pittsburgh following a stint with Tennessee and was selected by the Buffalo Bills in the fifth round of the 2017 NFL Draft.

Peterman struggled early in the NFL, throwing five interceptions during the first half of his starting debut and posting a 0.0 passer rating in the 2018 season opener. His 11 interceptions thrown within his first 100 career passing attempts remain the most by any NFL quarterback in such a span. Released by the Bills during the 2018 season, Peterman joined the Raiders franchise, where he served as a backup for four seasons. He signed with the Bears in 2022.

Early years
Peterman attended Bartram Trail High School in St. Johns, Florida. While at Bartram Trail, he played for the Bears football team. As a senior, he passed for 2,392 yards and 36 touchdowns. Peterman was rated as a four-star recruit and committed to the University of Tennessee to play college football under head coach Derek Dooley.

College career

University of Tennessee
In 2012, Peterman redshirted in first year at Tennessee. After the Vanderbilt game of that season, Dooley was fired as head coach.

After his redshirt freshman year, Peterman's head coach was Butch Jones. Peterman was one of the three backup quarterbacks as Justin Worley won the starting job in the offseason. Peterman made his collegiate debut in a home game at Neyland Stadium against Austin Peay in relief of Worley in a 45–0 victory. He was 4-of-8 passing for 28 yards against the Governors. After the game against #2 Oregon at Autzen Stadium, where Tennessee was defeated by a score of 59–14, Worley was benched in favor of Peterman. Peterman made his first career start against #19 Florida at Ben Hill Griffin Stadium in Gainesville, Florida. He was injured in the game and was eventually benched for Worley during the game after completing 4-of-11 passes for only five yards and two interceptions. The injury ended up being a broken hand. Overall, Peterman appeared in four games that season, completing 10-of-23 passes for 45 yards and two interceptions.

As a sophomore in 2014, he remained behind Worley on the depth chart. He played in seven games and made one start, which came against #4 Alabama at Neyland Stadium, after Worley was injured in the 34–3 loss to #3 Ole Miss. Despite getting the start, Joshua Dobbs relieved Peterman in the game. Dobbs started the next game against South Carolina and kept the job for the rest of the season. Peterman made one last appearance as a member of the Volunteers against Kentucky. In relief of Dobbs in the 50–16 victory, Peterman finished the game. He completed 10-of-20 passes for 49 yards on the 2014 season.

University of Pittsburgh
Peterman transferred as a graduate transfer to the University of Pittsburgh in 2015. Under new head coach Pat Narduzzi, Peterman entered the season as the backup to Chad Voytik, but replaced him as the starter after two games. In his first start, he completed 20-of-29 passes for 219 yards with two touchdowns and two interceptions in a 27–24 loss to Iowa. He kept the starting job for the rest of the year, completing 193-of-314 passes for 2,287 yards, 20 touchdowns, and eight interceptions as the Panthers finished with an 8–5 record.

Peterman returned as a starter his senior year in Pittsburgh. Peterman had a career day against the eventual National Champion Clemson Tigers on November 12. He threw for 308 yards and five touchdowns in the 43–42 victory. Pittsburgh's victory was Clemson's only loss of the season. He threw for 2,855 yards with 27 touchdowns, and seven interceptions as the Panthers once again finished with an 8–5 record.

College statistics

Professional career
On November 16, 2016, it was announced that Peterman accepted an invitation to play in the 2017 Senior Bowl. During Senior Bowl practices, Peterman impressed scouts and media in attendance after he displayed his decent size, accuracy, mobility, and his powerful arm. He met with representatives from the New Orleans Saints during the week and was praised by NFL analysts Daniel Jeremiah and Charles Davis. On January 28, 2017, Peterman played in the Senior Bowl and completed 16 of 23 pass attempt for 153 yards and a touchdown during the North 16–15 loss to the South. Peterman played for Chicago Bears head coach John Fox's North team during the game. Peterman was one of 15 collegiate quarterbacks who received an invitation to participate at the NFL Scouting Combine in Indianapolis, Indiana. He completed the majority of combine drills, but opted to skip the bench press. Peterman finished fifth among quarterbacks in the three-cone drill, seventh in the 40-yard dash and tied for sixth in the vertical jump and short shuttle.

Buffalo Bills
The Buffalo Bills selected Peterman in the fifth round (171st overall pick) of the 2017 NFL Draft, as the eighth quarterback selected.

2017
Peterman was brought in to compete for the Bills' backup quarterback position along with T. J. Yates and Cardale Jones. Peterman performed well enough to win the backup quarterback job after Jones was traded to the Los Angeles Chargers. Following the third preseason game against the Baltimore Ravens, Peterman became the only healthy quarterback for the Bills as starter Tyrod Taylor and Yates both sustained concussions in the game. This left open the possibility of Peterman starting for the team in Week 1, but Taylor recovered in time to start the season opener against the New York Jets. Had Peterman started the game, he would have been the second-lowest-drafted rookie quarterback to start a season opener since the AFL–NFL merger. During Week 10 against the New Orleans Saints, Peterman made his NFL debut with less than five minutes left in the game. With the Bills trailing 47–3, he led a scoring drive, completing 7 of 10 passes for 79 yards and one touchdown as the Bills lost by a score of 47–10. His first career touchdown pass was a 7-yard pass to tight end Nick O'Leary.

On November 15, 2017, Peterman was named the Bills' starting quarterback for the team's Week 11 game against the Los Angeles Chargers due to Taylor's struggles. During the game, Peterman threw five interceptions in the first half and was relieved by Taylor at the start of the second half. His five interceptions tied an NFL record for the most thrown in a player's first career start. Due to Taylor having suffered a knee injury in Week 13, Peterman started the Week 14 game against the Indianapolis Colts. During the game, which was played in a snowstorm, he completed 5 of 10 passes for 57 yards and a touchdown before leaving the game in the third quarter with a concussion. The Bills won in overtime by a score of 13–7.

On January 7, 2018, Peterman entered the Bills' Wild Card Round game against the Jacksonville Jaguars with 1:43 remaining in the 4th quarter after Taylor suffered a concussion. He managed to convert two first downs for the Buffalo offense, including a four-yard scramble to move the chains on fourth down, before throwing a critical interception to Jaguars cornerback Jalen Ramsey, thus sealing the 10–3 win for Jacksonville and ending the Bills' season.

2018

In the 2018 offseason, the Bills traded Taylor to the Cleveland Browns. Peterman competed with rookie first-round draft pick Josh Allen and free-agent signing A. J. McCarron for the starting quarterback position. On September 3, 2018, the Bills named Peterman their opening day starter over Allen after trading McCarron to the Oakland Raiders.

Starting in Week 1 against the Baltimore Ravens, Peterman completed 5-18 passes, for 24 yards, throwing two interceptions and not leading the team to a first down until the third quarter. He was benched in favor of Josh Allen after posting a 0.0 passer rating as the Bills lost 47–3.

On September 12, 2018, the Bills named Allen the starter for Week 2 against the Los Angeles Chargers, relegating Peterman to the bench. Four weeks later, the Bills signed Derek Anderson to serve as Allen's backup.

After Allen was injured against the Houston Texans and with Anderson inactive, Peterman entered the game and threw a touchdown to Zay Jones to put Buffalo in the lead. However, after the Texans tied the game at 13 late in the fourth quarter, Peterman threw two interceptions that cost the Bills the game, including a pick-six to cornerback Johnathan Joseph that proved to be Houston's winning score. On October 17, 2018, Bills head coach Sean McDermott confirmed that Anderson would start Week 7 against the Indianapolis Colts with Allen ruled out. However, after Anderson was hurt on Monday Night Football against the New England Patriots, Peterman played against the Chicago Bears on November 4.  In what would become Peterman's final start as a Bill, he rushed for a touchdown, snapping the team's streak of 11 straight quarters and 39 straight possessions without a touchdown, and threw for a career-high 188 yards, but also tossed three interceptions, including a pick six, as the Bills lost to the Bears by a score of 41–9.

Peterman was benched in favor of another mid–season signing, Matt Barkley, for the Week 10 matchup against the New York Jets. Barkley led the Bills to a 41–10 win over the Jets. With the Bills entering their bye week and Allen expected to be ready to play by the time of their next game, the Bills released Peterman on the evening of November 12. He finished his Buffalo career with four total touchdowns (three passing, one rushing), 12 interceptions and a passer rating of 32.5.

Oakland / Las Vegas Raiders
After workouts with the Detroit Lions and Denver Broncos, Peterman was signed by the Oakland Raiders as part of their practice squad on December 19, 2018, as head coach Jon Gruden had previously raved about Peterman's play in college. Peterman signed a reserve/future contract with the Raiders on January 1, 2019.

2019
Peterman had a strong preseason, but was placed on injured reserve with an elbow injury on September 2, 2019.

2020
On April 16, 2020, the Raiders re-signed Peterman, a restricted free agent, to an original-round tender. He was fined  by the NFL on October 5, 2020, for attending a maskless charity event hosted by teammate Darren Waller during the COVID-19 pandemic in violation of the NFL's COVID-19 protocols for the 2020 season.

Peterman made his first appearance for the Raiders in Week 12 against the Atlanta Falcons in relief of starter Derek Carr. Peterman completed 3 of 5 passes for 25 yards and rushed once for nine yards in the 43–6 blowout road loss.

2021
On February 4, 2021, Peterman signed a one-year contract extension with the Raiders. During a Week 5 20–9 loss to the Chicago Bears, he briefly relieved Derek Carr in the fourth quarter after Carr suffered an injury. On November 2, 2021, Peterman was released and was re-signed to the practice squad. His contract expired when the team's season ended on January 15, 2022.

Chicago Bears
On May 11, 2022, Peterman signed with the Chicago Bears. He was released on August 30, 2022, and signed to the practice squad the next day. The Bears flexed Peterman to the active roster on November 26, after an injury to starter Justin Fields.

During pregame warmups in week 12, primary backup Trevor Siemian, who was slated to start that week, suffered an oblique injury which led many people to believe that the Bears were going to start Peterman against the New York Jets, but Siemian ultimately ended up starting the game.

On December 3, 2022, Peterman was signed to the active roster after Siemian was placed on injured reserve, becoming Fields' primary backup. He made a relief appearance in place of Fields against his old team, the Buffalo Bills, during the waning moments of a 35–13 defeat on Christmas Eve. Peterman completed two passes before spiking the ball at the 50 yard line and attempting a Hail Mary pass that was intercepted by Bills safety Jaquan Johnson, allowing Buffalo to close out the game. 

On January 4, 2023, Peterman was named the starter for the Week 18 matchup against the Minnesota Vikings, replacing Justin Fields who was ruled out for a sore hip. Peterman threw for 114 yards and a touchdown in the 29-13 loss.

NFL career statistics

Regular season

Postseason

Personal life
The younger son of a pastor, Peterman credits his Christian faith in helping him face adversity. He is married to Morgan Peterman, his college girlfriend from Tennessee.

References

External links
 
 Chicago Bears bio
 Pittsburgh Panthers bio

1994 births
Living people
American football quarterbacks
American Christians
Buffalo Bills players
Chicago Bears players
Las Vegas Raiders players
Oakland Raiders players
Pittsburgh Panthers football players
Players of American football from Jacksonville, Florida
Tennessee Volunteers football players